Girth & Mirth (G&M) is an organized network of social groups for a gay subculture based on positive attitudes towards larger bodies and fat fetishism.  First formed in San Francisco in 1976, early chapters were established in Boston and New York.  Girth & Mirth gatherings were predecessors of the Convergence events, launched by the national Affiliated Bigmen's Club (ABC) in 1986, and collaboratively organized with various G&M chapters in subsequent years.  The popularity of Girth & Mirth clubs led to a broader chubby culture that intersected with bear groups in the early 1990s. Over time Girth & Mirth chapters overlapped with, or became absorbed by, ABC, which itself was renamed the Big Gay Men's Organization (BGMO) in 2013.

See also 
 National Association to Advance Fat Acceptance

References

External links 
Local Girth & Mirth clubs (BGMO affiliates)

Fat fetishism
International LGBT organizations
LGBT organizations in the United States
Fat acceptance movement